Stoltz Island is a small island off the northwest coast of Alexander Island, Antarctica, 7 nautical miles (13 km) south of Cape Vostok and  southwest of Buneva Point. The island was photographed from the air by the U.S. Navy, 1966, and was plotted by DOS, 1977, from the photographs and U.S. Landsat imagery of January 1974. Named by Advisory Committee on Antarctic Names (US-ACAN) for Lieutenant Commander Charles L. Stoltz, U.S. Navy, Staff Photographic Officer, Naval Support Force, Antarctica, Operation Deepfreeze, 1970 and 1971.

See also 
 List of Antarctic and sub-Antarctic islands
 Dint Island
 Dorsey Island
 Umber Island

Islands of Alexander Island